Natalia Irina “Natasha” Aguilar Komissarova (June 2, 1970 – January 1, 2016) was a female freestyle swimmer from Costa Rica who earned two medals (silver and bronze) with the women's relay team at the 1987 Pan American Games.

She also represented her native country at the 1988 Summer Olympics in Seoul, South Korea. Graduated from high school from Colegio La Salle in San Jose, Costa Rica. Her brother was Andrey Aguilar.

Aguilar died on January 1, 2016, of complications from a stroke after falling down the stairs. She was 45 years old.

References

External links
 sports-reference

1970 births
2016 deaths
Costa Rican female freestyle swimmers
Costa Rican people of Russian descent
Costa Rican female swimmers
Swimmers at the 1987 Pan American Games
Swimmers at the 1988 Summer Olympics
Olympic swimmers of Costa Rica
Pan American Games silver medalists for Costa Rica
Pan American Games bronze medalists for Costa Rica
Pan American Games medalists in swimming
Central American and Caribbean Games gold medalists for Costa Rica
Central American and Caribbean Games medalists in swimming
Competitors at the 1986 Central American and Caribbean Games
Medalists at the 1987 Pan American Games